Fry is an unincorporated community in Lincoln County, West Virginia, United States. Its first recorded appearance was in state business directories in 1908.

References

Unincorporated communities in Lincoln County, West Virginia
Unincorporated communities in West Virginia
Populated places on the Guyandotte River